This is the list of presidents of Veneto since 1970.

Presidents
Veneto